Center Township is one of seventeen townships in Dubuque County, Iowa, United States.  As of the 2000 census, its population was 1,726.

Geography
According to the United States Census Bureau, Center Township covers an area of 36.05 square miles (93.36 square kilometers).

Cities, towns, villages
 Asbury (partial)
 Centralia (north three-quarters)
 Graf

Unincorporated towns
 Budd at 
 Five Points at 
 Lattnerville at 
 Lore at 
 Twin Springs at 
(This list is based on USGS data and may include former settlements.)

Adjacent townships
 Jefferson Township (north)
 Peru Township (northeast)
 Dubuque Township (east)
 Dubuque Township (east)
 Vernon Township (south)
 Taylor Township (southwest)
 Iowa Township (west)
 Concord Township (northwest)

Cemeteries
The township contains these three cemeteries: Annunciation, Centralia Presbyterian and Saint Johns the Baptist Catholic Cemetery.

School districts
 Dubuque Community School District
 Western Dubuque Community School District

Political districts
 Iowa's 1st congressional district
 State House District 32
 State Senate District 16

References
 United States Census Bureau 2007 TIGER/Line Shapefiles
 United States Board on Geographic Names (GNIS)
 United States National Atlas

External links
 US-Counties.com
 City-Data.com

Townships in Dubuque County, Iowa
Townships in Iowa